A beard is the hair that dangles from the lower jaw of mammals and on a man's lower face.

Beard or bearded may also refer to:

Places

United States
 Beard, Indiana, an unincorporated town
 Beard, West Virginia, an unincorporated community
 Beard Cabin, a historic site in Shawnee, Oklahoma
 Beards Brook, a stream in New Hampshire

Elsewhere
 Beard, Australian Capital Territory
 Béard, a village and commune in the Nièvre département of France
 Beard Building, the first skyscraper in Toronto, Ontario, Canada
 Beard Peak, Marie Byrd Land, Antarctica

People
 Beard (surname)
 "The Beard", nickname of James Harden (born 1989), American basketball player

Art, entertainment, and media
 "The Beard", a 1995 Seinfeld episode
 The Beard (film), a 1966 film by Andy Warhol
 "The Beard", a 1994 Boy Meets World TV episode
 The Beard, a 1965 play by Michael McClure
 Bearded (magazine), a British bi-monthly music magazine
 The Beards (Australian band), an Australian comedy, folk rock band which formed in 2005

Other uses
 Beard (companion), an American slang term for describing someone used as a means for concealing infidelity or sexual orientation.
 Beard (grape), a white French wine grape variety
 Beard, the byssus of an edible mussel
 Beard, breast feathers of wild turkey and domestic turkey with display role

See also
Beard line, the line along the bottom of descenders in typography
Blackbeard (disambiguation)
Bluebeard (disambiguation)
Red Beard (disambiguation)